Mamure Castle is a medieval castle in the Bozdogan village, Anamur ilçe (district) of Mersin Province, Turkey.

Geography 

History 
The castle was built by the rulers of the Armenian Kingdom of Cilicia on the foundations of a fourth-century Roman castle. Designed to protect against pirates, it was repaired during the Byzantine era and during the Crusades. When Alaattin Keykubat I of Seljuk Turks captured the ruins of the castle in 1221, he built a larger castle using elements of the earlier fortifications. Later, it was controlled by the Karamanid dynasty (which was a Turkmen principality in Anatolia). Although the exact date is uncertain, according to an inscription by İbrahim II of Karaman in 1450, the castle was captured during Mahmut's reign (1300–1311). The castle was renamed as Mamure (prosperous) after repairs by Mahmut. In 1469, the castle was annexed by the Ottoman Empire. It was subsequently repaired in the 15th, 16th and 18th centuries and a part of the castle was used as a caravansarai.

Architecture 

The  castle is surrounded by moat. Its 39 towers and bastions are connected by wide ramparts. The castle has three main courtyards; to the west, the east and the south. The western courtyard contains  a small complex of a single minaret mosque and a ruined Turkish bath. The southern courtyard has the remains of a lighthouse.

Cultural depiction
This castle appears to be the Kalendria on the coast of Cilicia depicted by William Henry Bartlett in 1836. See external links below for the image and an associated poetical illustration by Letitia Elizabeth Landon. (However, the name Kalendria refers to Kalenderis, what is now Aydıncık, another town about 60 km east of Mamure)

Gallery

References

External links 

https://web.archive.org/web/20011021064228/http://www.anamur.gen.tr/eng/indx.htm
extensive photo series about the castle
Many Mamure Castle photos from after the renovation works
 . An engraving of Bartlett's painting with a poetical illustration by Letitia Elizabeth Landon for Fisher's Drawing Room Scrap Book, 1838.

Armenian Kingdom of Cilicia
Forts in Turkey
Castles in Turkey
Castles in Mersin Province
World Heritage Tentative List for Turkey
Archaeological sites in Mersin Province, Turkey
Karamanids